The Motagua Fault (also, Motagua Fault Zone) is a major, active left lateral-moving transform fault which cuts across Guatemala.  It forms part of the tectonic boundary between the North American Plate and the Caribbean Plate.  It is considered the onshore continuation of the Swan Islands Transform Fault and Cayman trench, which run under the Caribbean Sea. Its western end appears not to continue further than its surface trace, where it is covered by Cenozoic volcanics.

The Motagua Fault is regarded by some geologists as part of a system of faults designated the "Motagua-Polochic system" rather than as a discrete single boundary.  The Polochic fault (also referred to as the Chixoy-Polochic Fault) lies north and parallel to the Motagua Fault and shares some of the motion between the North American and Caribbean Plates.

Earthquakes

The Motagua Fault has been responsible for several major earthquakes in Guatemala's history, including the 7.5 Mw Guatemala 1976 earthquake, and is also notable for its significant visible fault trace.

References

External links
Datapages, Volume 28 (1978)
USGS Map

Seismic faults of Guatemala
Seismic faults of Mexico
Strike-slip faults
Motagua
Geographic areas of seismological interest
Pacific Coast of Mexico